Dominique Noguez, (12 September 1942 – 15 March 2019) was a French writer. He won the Prix Femina in 1997, for Amour noir. He taught the history of film at the Sorbonne. He was an early defender of Michel Houellebecq.

References

1942 births
2019 deaths
École Normale Supérieure alumni
20th-century French novelists
French male novelists
20th-century French male writers
21st-century French novelists
21st-century French male writers
People from Bolbec
Prix Femina winners
Academic staff of the University of Paris